The Giant is the third studio album by the German funeral doom metal band Ahab released through their long time label mate Napalm Records. The lyrics are based on Edgar Allan Poe's 1838 novel The Narrative of Arthur Gordon Pym of Nantucket.

Track listing 

Digipack & Vinyl bonus tracks

Personnel 
Ahab
 Daniel Droste – vocals, guitar, keyboards
 Christian Hector – guitar
 Stephan Wandernoth – bass
 Cornerlius Althammer – drums

Production
 Jens Siefert – recording, production, mixing and mastering
 Sebastian Jerke – artwork

References 

2012 albums
Ahab (band) albums
Music based on novels
Napalm Records albums
The Narrative of Arthur Gordon Pym of Nantucket
Music based on works by Edgar Allan Poe